22nd Indiana Battery Light Artillery was an artillery battery that served in the Union Army during the American Civil War.

Service
The battery was organized at Indianapolis, Indiana, in October 1862 and mustered in December 15, 1862, for a three-year enlistment under the command of Captain Benjamin F. Denning.

The battery was unattached, Army of Kentucky, Department of the Ohio, to June 1863. 1st Brigade, 2nd Division, 23rd Corps, Army of the Ohio, to August 1863. Russellsville, Kentucky, 1st Division, XXIII Corps, to December 1863. District of Southwest Kentucky, 1st Division, XXIII Corps, to April 1864. Camp Burnside, Kentucky, District of Kentucky, Department of the Ohio, to June 1864. Artillery, 2nd Division, XXIII Corps, to November 1864. Garrison Artillery, Nashville, Tennessee, Department of the Cumberland, to December 1864. Artillery, 1st Division, XXIII Corps, Army of the Ohio, to February 1865, and Department of North Carolina to April 1865. Artillery, 1st Division, X Corps, Department of North Carolina, to June 1865.

The 22nd Indiana Battery Light Artillery mustered out of service on July 7, 1865, in Indianapolis.

Detailed service
Left Indiana for Louisville, Kentucky, March 1863. Duty at Louisville, Bowling Green, and Russellville, Kentucky, until December 1863. Pursuit of Morgan July 2–26, 1863. Moved to Point Burnside, Kentucky, December 1863, and duty there until May 1864. Ordered to join Army of the Ohio in the field. Atlanta Campaign June 29-September 8. Nickajack Creek July 2–5. Chattahoochie River July 5–17. Decatur July 19. Howard House July 20. Siege of Atlanta July 22-August 25. Utoy Creek August 5–7. Flank movement on Jonesboro August 25–30. Lovejoy's Station September 2–6. Pursuit of Hood into Alabama October 1–26. Nashville Campaign November–December. Battle of Franklin November 30. Battle of Nashville December 15–16. Pursuit of Hood to the Tennessee River December 17–28. At Clifton, Tennessee, until January 16, 1865. Movement to Washington, D.C., then to Morehead City, North Carolina, January 16-February 20. Campaign of the Carolinas March 1-April 26. Advance on Kinston and Goldsboro March 6–21. Battle of Wyse Fork March 8–10. Occupation of Kinston March 14. Occupation of Goldsboro March 21. Advance on Raleigh April 10–14. Occupation of Raleigh April 14. Bennett's House April 26. Surrender of Johnston and his army. Duty in North Carolina until June. Ordered to Indianapolis.

Casualties
The battery lost a total of 13 men during service; 1 officer and 1 enlisted men killed or mortally wounded, 11 enlisted men died of disease.

Commanders
 Captain Benjamin F. Denning - mortally wounded July 1, 1864
 Captain Edward W. Nicholson
 Lieutenant George W. Alexander - commanded during the Carolinas Campaign

See also

 List of Indiana Civil War regiments
 Indiana in the Civil War

References
 Dyer, Frederick H. A Compendium of the War of the Rebellion (Des Moines, IA: Dyer Pub. Co.), 1908.
Attribution
 

Military units and formations established in 1862
Military units and formations disestablished in 1865
Units and formations of the Union Army from Indiana
1862 establishments in Indiana
Artillery units and formations of the American Civil War